Burlorne Pillow (meaning "badger's pool at Burlorne") is a hamlet in the civil parish of Egloshayle, north Cornwall, England, United Kingdom. It is situated on the eastern bank of the River Camel near Burlawn, Burlorne Tregoose, Polbrock, and Brocton.

References

Hamlets in Cornwall